Nancy J. Hartling   (born February 1, 1950) is a Canadian Senator from Moncton, New Brunswick. She was Executive Director of Support to Single Parents Inc., as well as a founding member of St. James Court Inc., a non-profit housing complex which provides single parents with affordable housing. On October 27, 2016, Hartling was named to the Senate of Canada by Prime Minister Justin Trudeau to sit as an independent and assumed office on November 10, 2016.

Early life and education
Hartling was born in Tatamagouche, Nova Scotia, to a Royal Canadian Navy family.  She moved frequently with her family across Eastern Canada, attending school in Ottawa. Hartling settled in Moncton, New Brunswick. She obtained a bachelor's degree from Norwich University, and a master's degree in adult education from St. Francis Xavier University.

Career
Hartling founded Support to Single Parents Inc. in 1982, and remained the director until its dissolution in 2016. She spent most of her career advocating for women's issues and was a lecturer on family violence issues at the University of New Brunswick. She also helped to create St. James Court Inc., an apartment complex for single parents. St. James Court received funding in part from the Canada Mortgage and Housing Corporation, and operates as a nonprofit organization. She co-chaired a New Brunswick working group on violence against women convened by the provincial government.

Senate of Canada
Hartling was appointed to the Senate of Canada upon retirement in 2016, after applying through the Independent Advisory Board for Senate Appointments.

Awards
Order of New Brunswick inducted in 2016.
Governor General's Award, 2011.

References

External links
Senate Biography

1950 births
21st-century Canadian politicians
21st-century Canadian women politicians
Canadian activists
Canadian senators from New Brunswick
Women members of the Senate of Canada
Independent Senators Group
Living people
People from Colchester County
People from Moncton
Governor General's Award in Commemoration of the Persons Case winners